{{Infobox station
 | name=Dorsey
 | style=MARC
 | type=MARC commuter rail station
 | image=Dorsey MARC Station.JPG
 | image_caption=Dorsey station from the parking lot
 | address=7000 Deerpath Road, Dorsey, Maryland
 | coordinates=
 | line=Capital Subdivision
 | other= MTA Bus 201 RTA 409, RTA 501
 | platform=2 side platforms
 | tracks=2
 | parking=802 spaces
 | bicycle=Yes
 | passengers= 585 daily
 | pass_year= 2018
 | pass_percent= 3.5
 | pass_system= MARC
 | opened=1996
 | rebuilt=
 | ADA=Yes
 | code=
 | owned=
 | zone=
 | services= 
 | other_services_header=Former services
 | other_services_collapsible=yes
 | other_services= 
}}Dorsey''' is a passenger rail station on the MARC Camden Line between Washington, DC and Baltimore's Camden Station. The station is located at Exit 7 on Maryland Route 100, a.k.a.; the Paul T. Pitcher Memorial Highway. It was built by MARC in 1996 as a replacement for a former Baltimore and Ohio Railroad station located next to a  clearance bridge over Maryland Route 103. The former B&O station site is now a condominium development.

Connections
 MTA Bus 201: Dorsey Station to BWI Rail Station
 RTA 409 (Purple): Elkridge Corners Shopping Center to Towne Centre at Laurel
 RTA 501 (Silver): The Mall in Columbia to BWI Airport

Nearby places and attractions
 Elkridge, Maryland
 Ellicott City, Maryland
 UMUC Dorsey Station Campus
 Arundel Mills Mall
 Troy Park
 Oxford Square
 Troy Hill Business Park

Station layout
The station has two side platforms with a station house on the southbound platform. The station is compliant with the Americans with Disabilities Act of 1990.

References

External links
 TrainWeb images
 Platforms beneath MD 100 Bridge
 Station Building; December 2000
 Station from Highway 100 from Google Maps Street View

Camden Line
MARC Train stations
Former Baltimore and Ohio Railroad stations
Transportation buildings and structures in Howard County, Maryland
Railway stations in the United States opened in 1996
1996 establishments in Maryland